Charles Richard Spencer (21 June 1903 – 29 September 1941) was a Welsh cricketer.  Spencer was a right-handed batsman and wicketkeeper. He was born at Llandough, Penarth, Vale of Glamorgan.

While at Magdalen College, Oxford, Spencer made his first-class debut playing for Oxford University in 1923 against the touring West Indians.  During that same season he played for the university against HDG Leveson-Gower's XI.  His final appearance for the university came in 1924 against Middlesex.

Spencer also represented Glamorgan in a single first-class match in 1925 against HDG Leveson-Gower's XI at St. Helen's.  In his first-class career he scored 46 runs at a batting average of 11.50, with a high score of 17.  Behind the stumps he took 1 catch and made 1 stumping.

Following his brief cricketing career, he went on to teach at Stowe School, Buckinghamshire.  Spencer died at Havant, Hampshire, on 29 September 1941 while serving with the Royal Marines.

References

External links
Charles Spencer at Cricinfo
Charles Spencer at CricketArchive

1903 births
1941 deaths
Alumni of Magdalen College, Oxford
Royal Marines personnel killed in World War II
Cricketers from the Vale of Glamorgan
Glamorgan cricketers
Oxford University cricketers
Royal Marines officers
Royal Marines personnel of World War II
Welsh cricketers
Wicket-keepers
Welsh military personnel